Dosapadu Halt railway station is a railway station located near the Dosapadu stream. It serves the villages of Pamulapadu and Dosapadu. It lies on the Vijayawada–Nidadavolu loop line and is administered under Vijayawada railway division of South Coast Railway Zone

References 

Railway stations in Vijayawada railway division
Railway stations in Krishna district